Miss Earth México 2012, the 11th annual national beauty pageant of Miss Earth México, will be held late summer of 2012. 2011 crowned winner, Casandra Ananké Becerra Vázquez from Distrito Federal, will crown the new winner.

The winner of Miss Earth México 2012 will represent México in the international Miss Earth 2012 pageant which will be held on November 24, 2012 in Philippines.

Results

Special awards
Special awards were given during the Miss Earth México 2012 coronation night as follows:

Delegates
The following is the list of delegates that represented the 32 States of Mexico as listed in the Miss Earth Mexico 2012 website including their height and age during the pageant:

See also
Miss Earth Mexico

References

External links
Official Website

2012
2012 in Mexico
2012 beauty pageants